Gârbău is a commune in Cluj County, Transylvania, Romania. It is composed of five villages: Cornești (Sólyomtelke), Gârbău, Nădășelu (Magyarnádas), Turea (Türe) and Viștea (Magyarvista).

Demographics

At the 2011 census, 48.8% of inhabitants were Romanians, 44.3% Hungarians and 4.0% Roma.

Notes

Communes in Cluj County
Localities in Transylvania